The Central Asia-South Asia power project, commonly known by the acronym CASA-1000, is a $1.16 billion project currently under construction that will allow for the export of surplus hydroelectricity from Kyrgyzstan and Tajikistan to Afghanistan and finally to Pakistan. Groundbreaking for the project took place in May 2016 by leaders of the four nations. The entire project is expected to be completed in 2023.

Project details

The project will allow for the export of 1,300 megawatts of electricity during the summer months when both Tajikistan and Kyrgyzstan experience surplus electricity generation from hydroelectric dams.

High voltage direct current (HVDC) converter stations will also be included as part of the project, as well as a 477 kilometer long, 500 kilovolt alternating current transmission line between Datka, Kyrgyzstan and Khujand, Tajikistan. A 1,300 MW AC/DC converter station will be constructed in the city of Sangtuda, Tajikistan, as well as a 300 MW converter station in Kabul, Afghanistan. A 750km HVDC line will be constructed between Sangtuda, and the city of Peshawar, Pakistan, via the Salang Pass and Kabul. In Peshawar, a 1,300 MW converter station will be built and connected to Pakistan's electric grid.

Transmission lines are designed to transmit 1,300 MW of electricity, with Afghanistan allotted 300 MW of electricity and Pakistan 1000 MW of electricity.

The project was inaugurated in February 2020, in a ceremony attended by Afghan President Ashraf Ghani and then-Pakistani Ambassador to Afghanistan Zahid Nasrullah Khan. As of March 2021, approximately 30% of the project covering Afghanistan was completed. In June 2021, Panjshir governor Kamaluddin Nezami consulted with citizens' and local government representatives on "social obstacles" to the CASA-1000 project.

References

External links
CASA-1000 official website

 
Foreign trade of Pakistan
Afghanistan
Afghanistan
Infrastructure in Afghanistan
2016 establishments in Pakistan
Pakistan–Tajikistan relations
Kyrgyzstan–Pakistan relations